This is a list of the main career statistics of professional tennis player Juan Carlos Ferrero.

Major finals

Grand Slam finals

Singles: 3 (1 title, 2 runners-up)

Masters Series finals

Singles: 6 (4 titles, 2 runners-up)

Masters Cup final

Singles: 1 (0 titles, 1 runners-up)

ATP career finals

Singles: 34 (16 titles, 18 runner-ups)

ATP Challengers & ITF Futures Singles finals

Performance timelines

Singles

Doubles

ITF Futures Doubles finals

Head-to-head against other players
Ferrero's win-loss record against certain players who have been ATPranked World No. 10 or better is as follows:

Players who have been ranked world No. 1 are in boldface.

ATP Tour career earnings

 * As of 19 Nov 2012.

Top-10 wins per season

Wins over top-10 players per season

Notes

References

External links 
 
 
 

Ferrero, Juan Carlos